Kołodziejczyk is a Polish-language occupational surname derived from the occupation of kołodziej ("wheelwright"). Notable people with this surname include:
Cody Kolodziejzyk (born 1990), Canadian Internet personality and rapper
Dariusz Kołodziejczyk (born 1962), Polish historian
Greg Kolodziejzyk (born 1961), Canadian cyclist
Katarzyna Kołodziejczyk (born 1998), Polish sprint canoeist
Nikola Kołodziejczyk (born 1986), Polish musician
Piotr Kołodziejczyk (1939–2019), Polish Minister of National Defence

See also
 
Kołodziejczak
Kołodziej

Polish-language surnames
Occupational surnames